Pleurobranchaea maculata, or the grey side-gilled slug, is a species of sea slug, specifically a side-gill slug or notaspidean. It is a marine gastropod mollusc in the family Pleurobranchaeidae.

Distribution
This species occurs around the North Island and South Island of New Zealand. In 2009  it was reported far outside its native range, on the coast of Argentina from where it spread rapidly, currently encompassing ca. 2,000 km along the southwestern Atlantic coast.

Habitat
This side-gill slug is found intertidally in harbours, and to depths of up to 250 m off rocky coasts.

Description
This slug has no shell. The coloration is pale grey, densely patterned with short, brown lines. The animal is up to 100 mm in length.

Life habits
This slug eats sea anemones, marine worms, and molluscs.

In 2009, a major scare in the Auckland Region of New Zealand was sparked after several dogs died of tetrodotoxin poisoning after eating Pleurobranchaea maculata on beaches. Children and pet owners were asked to avoid beaches, and recreational fishing was also interrupted for a time. After exhaustive analysis, it was found that the sea slugs must have ingested tetrodotoxin.

References

External links 

 Photo

Pleurobranchaeidae
Gastropods of New Zealand